Dead End Kings is Katatonia's ninth full-length album. It was released on 27 August 2012 in Europe and 28 August in the United States through Peaceville Records. Like all Katatonia releases, the album was written primarily by founding members Jonas Renkse and Anders Nyström. The band went through a number of lineup changes, making the album the first to feature bassist Niklas Sandin, the only album to feature second guitarist Per Eriksson, and the last to feature drummer Daniel Liljekvist.

Themes and composition
Multiple tracks, including "Buildings", allude to abandoned city scenes, which were inspired by Renkse's and Nyström's visiting of abandoned train tunnels and hospitals in abandoned villages in Sweden. The album is not politically-themed in the conventional sense of promoting ideologies or presenting solutions, but rather contemplates and laments the poor state of the world due to modern politics in general.

Journalists have noted a similarity in sound to the work of American progressive metal band Tool, a comparison Renkse refers to as accidental but flattering.

Reception

The album was generally well received by critics. AllMusic praised the diverse  and layered sound production on the album, concluding that "With its various parts, ever-shifting dynamics, and blazing instrumental interludes, it sends the set off with a nearly majestic bang. Dead End Kings is uncompromising in its musical excellence, bleak vision, and dark, hunted beauty; it extends Katatonia's reach exponentially. Kyle Ward, staff reviewer from Sputnikmusic, strongly praised the album for being the perfect culmination of everything the band had strived to become after moving away from their original death metal sound in the late 1990s, citing the albums high production values, layered sound and "emotional sincerity" for the album being a "massive success".

Track listing

Personnel

Katatonia
Jonas Renkse – lead vocals; guitars, production, mixing
Anders Nyström – guitars, keyboards (12 & 13), backing vocals; production, mixing
Per Eriksson – guitars, backing vocals; engineering
Niklas Sandin – bass
Daniel Liljekvist – drums

Additional personnel
Frank Default – keyboards (1-11)
Silje Wergeland – backing vocals (2)
JP Asplund – addition percussion
David Castillo – production, engineering, mixing
Travis Smith – album cover

Charts

References

2012 albums
Katatonia albums
Peaceville Records albums
Progressive metal albums